Samik Bhattacharya is an Indian politician and member of the Bharatiya Janata Party. He is spokesperson of BJP's West Bengal state unit and a very well known face in Bengali media. Bhattacharya was a member of the West Bengal Legislative Assembly from the Basirhat Dakshin constituency in North 24 Parganas district.

Political career
Samik Bhattacharya went to West Bengal Legislative Assembly after winning 2014 by-election from Basirhat Dakshin constituency . He also contested 2016 West Bengal Legislative Assembly election from same seat but lost the election.

He lost 2019 Lok Sabha election from Dum Dum Parliamentary constituency as BJP candidate against AITC's candidate Sougata Roy. Also, he contested 2021 West Bengal Legislative Assembly election, but lost.

References

1981 births
Living people
Bharatiya Janata Party politicians from West Bengal
People from Basirhat
West Bengal MLAs 2011–2016